Bacolod City Domestic Airport (Filipino: Paliparang Domestiko ng Lungsod ng Bacolod, Hiligaynon: Domestiko nga Hulugpaan sang Dakbanwa sang Bacolod) , also known as Bacolod Airport, was the airport serving the general area of Bacolod, the capital city of Negros Occidental in the Philippines. It was one of the busiest airports in the Western Visayas region and was one of four trunkline airports, or major commercial domestic airports, in the region, the others being Mandurriao Airport in Iloilo City, Roxas Airport in Roxas and Puerto Princesa Airport in Puerto Princesa.  This airport was replaced by the new Bacolod–Silay Airport, located in nearby Silay.

It was classified as such by the Air Transportation Office, a body of the Department of Transportation that is responsible for the operations of all other airports in the Philippines except the major international airports. As of February 2007, Cebu Pacific had increased its number of flights from Manila to Bacolod.  The airport surpassed the Iloilo City Mandurriao Airport in the number of arriving passengers.

The airport was built by the Lopez family in 1936 to serve the Iloilo - Negros Air Express Company's flights to and from Bacolod, Iloilo and Manila.  It was bought by Philippine Airlines after World War II. The Bacolod City Domestic Airport ceased operations on 17 January 2008, prior to the opening of the Bacolod–Silay Airport which began operations the day after. As of 2012, the airport is closed to air traffic however the terminal now serves as a ticketing office for Philippine Airlines, while the Cebu Pacific Terminal around 400m from the main terminal was made into an Aviation School for aircraft mechanics, as well as ground pilot training.

In 2016, Senator Franklin Drilon suggested to the city government of Bacolod to re-develop the whole airport grounds into a business park, following the success of converting the Mandurriao Airport in Iloilo City into a central business district.

Former airlines and destinations
The destinations of Bacolod City Domestic Airport before its closure.

Incidents

 On March 22, 1998, Philippine Airlines Flight 137, an Airbus A320-200 (registered as RP-C3222) overshot the runway while attempting a landing at Bacolod. There were no casualties among the passengers and crew, but three people on the ground were killed.

See also
 List of airports in the Philippines

References

External links
 
 

Defunct airports in the Philippines
Airports established in 1936
Airports disestablished in 2008
1936 establishments in the Philippines
2008 disestablishments in the Philippines
Buildings and structures in Bacolod
Transportation in the Visayas